Natalie Jackson Mendoza (born 12 August 1976) is an Australian actress, singer, and dancer. She is best known for her roles as one of the main characters, Jackie Clunes, in the British drama series Hotel Babylon (2006–2008) and as Juno in the horror film The Descent (2005), as well as its sequel, The Descent Part 2 (2009). Mendoza has also performed in various stage productions across the West End and Broadway, including Miss Saigon (role of "Gigi"), Here Lies Love ("Imelda Marcos"), and Spider-Man: Turn Off The Dark ("Arachne").

Life and career 
Mendoza was born in Hong Kong in 1976, to mother Robin Jackson, an Australian television personality of German descent, and father Noel Mendoza, a jazz pianist and arranger of Filipino descent. She is one of six artist siblings. She was raised in Sydney, Melbourne, and Hong Kong. She also went to school and trained in London and New York. She performed in many musicals such as Cats, Miss Saigon, The Music of Lloyd Webber Concert Tour (understudying Sarah Brightman),  Oh What A Night, 25th Annual Putnam County Spelling Bee, as the lead Frugue girl in Sweet Charity, and took the role of Eponine in the 10th Anniversary Australasian Tour of Les Miserables.

In 1998 Mendoza formed the band Jackson Mendoza with her sister Rebecca. They had No 1 chart success and signed internationally to Virgin Records, releasing two singles that reached the Top 10 music charts in Australia. They disbanded in 2000. 

Mendoza appeared in Golden Globe award winning film Moulin Rouge!, as the lead dancer China Doll.  After Moulin Rouge! she began working on a solo album in Melbourne and signed a three-picture deal with Miramax. She filmed several US series including Farscape and played Liat in ABC's South Pacific opposite Harry Connick Junior and Glenn Close.

In 2003 Mendoza returned to England to focus her attention on acting. She trained as an actor at the prestigious Bristol Old Vic Theatre School, training in Classical Theatre. Mendoza appeared on stage in many classical theatre and modern theatre productions, including Coup d'État at MTC, Five Kinds of Silence, The Vagina Monologues, Macbeth, Romeo and Juliet, and The Importance of Being Earnest.

In 2005, Mendoza was cast in a lead role Juno in the film The Descent.  The film was directed by Neil Marshall, which has gone on to be a horror cult gem amongst audiences.

In 2006 she performed in the series regular role of Jackie Clunes in the BBC1 British drama series Hotel Babylon. Mendoza appeared in seasons 1-3 of the series.

In 2007 Mendoza guest-starred in the Doctor Who audio dramas Absolution and The Girl Who Never Was. She filmed The Descent 2 sequel and horror film Surviving Evil, which she wrote the title track for, "Alone Again". She workshopped the lead role of Molly in Matthew Warchus' production of Ghost which was based on the original screenplay by Bruce Rubin.

In 2010, Mendoza originated the role of Arachne in the Broadway musical Spider-Man: Turn Off the Dark.  After playing a handful of preview performances, she was forced to leave after an injury occurred backstage.

Mendoza won her first film festival entry as best director, best writer, and best film at the 72-hour film festival in Los Angeles 2011.

From 2017-2020, Mendoza guest starred in various television productions, including Blue Bloods, Holby City, and McDonald & Dodds.

Mendoza will next be see in the Leos Carax-directed musical film Annette, starring Adam Driver and Marion Cotillard.

In 2021, she joined the cast of the musical Moulin Rouge! on Broadway, playing the lead role of Satine.

Filmography

Film

Television

Theatre

References

External links 
 
 

1978 births
Living people
Actresses from Melbourne
Australian female dancers
Australian expatriates in England
Australian film actresses
Australian television actresses
21st-century Australian singers
21st-century Australian women singers
Australian actresses of Asian descent